Mary's Pond, also known as Marys Pond, is an  kettle pond in Rochester, Massachusetts. The pond is located east of Leonards Pond. Rochester's town beach is located on the northwestern shore of the pond along Mary's Pond Road.  

In 2011, amid plans to create a recreation area on the popular beach, a title search revealed that the beach was privately owned.  Although the town of Rochester maintains Mary's Pond Road through an easement, and although the State of Massachusetts maintains the pond itself, the beach is now closed to the public.

References

External links
MassWildlife - Pond Map and info
Environmental Protection Agency

Ponds of Plymouth County, Massachusetts
Rochester, Massachusetts
Ponds of Massachusetts